Metro is a Polish television channel, launched on December 2, 2016. The first main owner of Metro was Agora SA - one of the largest and most renowned media companies in Poland, publisher of Gazeta Wyborcza. Shortly after the start of broadcasting, Agora SA sold to Discovery Communications (now Warner Bros. Discovery) a 49% of the shares in Metro. In August 2017, Discovery announced that it would buy on 1 September 2017 the remaining 51% for PLN 19 million under a share buyback agreement.

Programming
Metro is a channel with movies, documentaries and lifestyle programs.

References

External links
 Official Site 

2016 establishments in Poland
Television channels in Poland
Television channels and stations established in 2016
Warner Bros. Discovery EMEA